The Crazy Clock Maker is a 1915 American silent comedy film starring Billy Bowers and featuring Oliver Hardy in a supporting role.

Cast
 Billy Bowers		
 Myra Brooks
 Ray Ford	
 Clay Grant
 Oliver Hardy (as Babe Hardy)
 Betty Holton		
 Beatrice Miller		
 Mabel Paige
 C.W. Ritchie		
 Walter Schimpf		
 Bill Watson		
 Hod Weston

See also
 List of American films of 1915
 Oliver Hardy filmography

References

External links

1915 films
1915 comedy films
1915 short films
American silent short films
American black-and-white films
Films directed by Jerold T. Hevener
Silent American comedy films
American comedy short films
1910s American films
1910s English-language films